Richard Winwood may refer to:
Richard Winwood (MP) (1609–1688), English MP for Windsor
Richard I. Winwood (born 1943), American writer